The 2019 Ballon d'Or  (French: Ballon d'Or) was the 64th annual ceremony of the Ballon d'Or, presented by France Football, and recognising the best footballers in the world for 2019. Lionel Messi won the men's award for a record sixth time in his career.

Ballon d'Or
The nominees for the awards were announced on 6 November 2019.

Ballon d'Or Féminin

Megan Rapinoe won the 2019 Ballon d'Or Féminin for best female player in the world.

Kopa Trophy

Matthijs de Ligt won the 2019 Kopa Trophy for the best player in the world under the age of 21.

Yashin Trophy

Alisson won the inaugural Yashin Trophy as the best goalkeeper in the world in 2019.

References

2019
Ballon d'Or
Ballon d'Or